Robert J. Ringer (born 1938) is an American entrepreneur, motivational and political speaker, and author of several best-selling personal-development and political books.

Career 
His first book, Winning Through Intimidation, was published in 1973. After the manuscript racked up 23 rejections from publishers, Ringer decided to self-publish the book. It became a #1 bestseller, spending 36 weeks at the top of The New York Times Best Seller list. In 2002, Ringer revised and updated it and republished it with a new title: To Be or Not to Be Intimidated?: That is the Question. He says that the change was made to clarify his aim in the books—not to turn people into intimidators, but to give them the tools to keep others from intimidating them.

Ringer also self-published his second book, Looking Out for #1, in 1977, which also became a New York Times #1 bestseller. Some of its recurring themes are action based on rational thought, conceding and in fact adhering to the inherent objective human nature of self-interest, and avoiding irrational people (which he called neurotics or "weeds").

Ringer's first political/ideological work, Restoring the American Dream, reached #3 on The New York Times Bestseller List in 1979. It was revised, updated and republished in 2010. Its premise is that liberty must be given a higher priority than all other objectives and that a laissez-faire free market is the clear solution to America's economic troubles.

Ringer established Stratford Press to publish and re-release books by other authors. Its title include Crisis Investing by Douglas R. Casey, The Alpha Strategy by John A. Pugsley, and Nice Girls Do by Irene Kassorla.

Ringer has appeared on The Tonight Show, Today, The Dennis Miller Show, Good Morning America, ABC News Nightline, and The Charlie Rose Show, Fox News, and Fox Business. He has been the subject of feature articles in such publications as Time, People, The Wall Street Journal, Fortune, Barron's and The New York Times.

Books

References

External links 

Bio from his speaking agent

1938 births
Living people
American marketing people
American motivational speakers
American motivational writers
American political writers
American male non-fiction writers
American self-help writers
Objectivists